PS Kab. Tapin or Persatuan Sepakbola Kabupaten Tapin (en: Football Association of Tapin Regency) is an Indonesian football club based in Tapin Regency, South Kalimantan. Club played at Liga 3.

References

External links
Liga-Indonesia.co.id

Football clubs in Indonesia
Football clubs in South Kalimantan